Jim O'Neil (born October 26, 1978) is an American football coach who most recently was the defensive coordinator at Northwestern University. He has previously been a coach in the NFL for the New York Jets, Buffalo Bills, Cleveland Browns, the San Francisco 49ers and Las Vegas Raiders. He was a coach for numerous college football teams before that.

Coaching career

College
From 2006-2008, he was at Eastern Michigan as the recruiting coordinator and safeties coach.  He was the defensive coordinator at Towson in 2005, a graduate assistant/defensive back coach at Northwestern from 2003–04, assistant offensive line coach at Pennsylvania in 2002 and an assistant offensive line/tight ends coach at SUNY Albany in 2001.

New York Jets
O'Neil entered the NFL joining the New York Jets as a defensive quality control & defensive backs coach in 2009. He was moved to assistant defensive backs coach in 2010 and remained in that position through the 2012 season.

Buffalo Bills
O’Neil spent the 2013 season as the linebackers coach for the Buffalo Bills.

Cleveland Browns
After the 2013 season, O'Neil was hired as the defensive coordinator of the Cleveland Browns in 2014, but was relieved of his duties after the 2015 season due to a coaching overhaul after head coach Mike Pettine was fired.

San Francisco 49ers
O'Neil was hired by Chip Kelly on January 26, 2016 to become the defensive coordinator of the San Francisco 49ers.

References

External links
New York Jets bio
Buffalo Bills bio

Towson Tigers football players
New York Jets coaches
Buffalo Bills coaches
Cleveland Browns coaches
San Francisco 49ers coaches
National Football League defensive coordinators
Living people
1978 births
Las Vegas Raiders coaches
Oakland Raiders coaches
Albany Great Danes football coaches
Penn Quakers football coaches
Northwestern Wildcats football coaches
Eastern Michigan Eagles football coaches